Center Creek is an unincorporated community in Wasatch County, Utah, United States.

References

Unincorporated communities in Wasatch County, Utah
Unincorporated communities in Utah